Conly (a variant of Conley) is an Irish name (from Ó Conghalaigh). It may refer to:

People

Surname 
 Jane Leslie Conly (born 1948), an American author
 Paul Conly, musician with Lothar and the Hand People
 Robert Leslie Conly (1918–1973), author under the pen name Robert C. O'Brien
 Sean Conly, bass player for Grass Roots

Given name 
 Conly Rieder, cancer researcher
 Conly John Paget Dease (1906–1979), Australian quiz show host

Other uses 
 Conly Site, Bienville Parish, Louisiana, listed on the NRHP in Louisiana

English-language surnames
Surnames of Irish origin